Work at Oil Derricks is a 1907 Azerbaijani film directed by Vasili Amaşukeli.

The film was shot on 35 mm and captures oil production at a works in the Azeri capital of Baku.

See also
List of Azerbaijani films: 1898-1919

Azerbaijani documentary films
1907 films
Azerbaijani silent films
Azerbaijani black-and-white films
Films of the Russian Empire